Less Than Kin is a lost 1918 American silent comedy film directed by Donald Crisp and written by Marion Fairfax and Alice Duer Miller. The film stars Wallace Reid, Ann Little, Raymond Hatton, Noah Beery, Sr., James Neill and Charles Ogle. The film was released on July 21, 1918, by Paramount Pictures.

Plot
As described in a film magazine, Lewis Vickers (Reid), a young American languishing in South America because he is "wanted" for a crime which was the result of an accident, comes across another American Hobart Lee (Reid) who greatly resembles him. That man dies and Vickers, to get back to the United States, decides to impersonate him. He is taken to the family group upon his arrival in New York City and soon finds himself possessed of the encumbrances and debts left by the former youth, which include a wife and three children. He is left a fortune, but discloses his identity and flees to Canada. En route he marries the ward of his benefactor, who had helped him escape and had hid in his automobile. Eventually he is cleared of all guilt and has a happy ending.

Cast
Wallace Reid as Hobart Lee / Lewis Vickers
Ann Little as Nellie Reid
Raymond Hatton as James Emmons
Noah Beery, Sr. as Senor Cortez
James Neill as Dr. Nunez
Charles Ogle as Overton
Jane Wolfe as Maria (credited as Jane Wolff)
James Cruze as Jinx
Guy Oliver as Peters
Calvert Carter as Plimpton
Jack Herbert as Sheriff (credited as J. Herbert)
Gustav von Seyffertitz as Endicott Lee

See also
Wallace Reid filmography

References

External links 
 
 

1918 films
1910s English-language films
Silent American comedy films
1918 comedy films
Paramount Pictures films
Films directed by Donald Crisp
American black-and-white films
American silent feature films
Lost American films
Films about identity theft
1918 lost films
Lost comedy films
1910s American films